Robert Thomas Flower, 8th Viscount Ashbrook (1 April 1836 – 9 March 1919) was an Irish aristocrat, Lieutenant-Colonel in the British Army, and inventor.

Biography

Early life
Robert Thomas Flower was born on 1 April 1836 at Castle Durrow, Durrow, County Laois, Ireland. His father was Henry Jeffrey Flower, 5th Viscount Ashbrook (1806–1871) and his mother, Frances Robinson (1803-1886). He had three sisters and two brothers, Henry Jeffrey Flower, 6th Viscount Ashbrook (1829–1882) and William Spencer Flower, 7th Viscount Ashbrook (1830–1906).

Career
He gained the rank of Lieutenant-Colonel in the service of the 4th Battalion in the Prince of Wales's Leinster Regiment.

He invented an easy-to-use handloom for the unskilled and disabled, and a latch-hook needle that speeds up the weaving process. The techniques were used by Yvo Richard Vesey, 5th Viscount de Vesci (1881–1958), who opened a carpet factory and hired women to do the weaving. The carpets were sold at Harrods in London and at Marshall Field's in Chicago.

He became the 8th Viscount Ashbrook and the 9th Baron Castle-Durrow on 26 November 1906.

Personal life
He married Gertrude Sophia Hamilton, daughter of Reverend Sewell Hamilton, on 18 July 1866. They had five children:
Hon. Frances Mary Flower (married Henry Ernest White).
Hon. Eva Constance Gertrude Flower (unknown-1928).
Hon. Gertrude Flower (unknown-1956).
Llowarch Robert Flower, 9th Viscount Ashbrook (1870-1936).
Hon. Reginald Henry Flower (1871-1938).

He resided at 22 Adelaide Crescent in Hove, East Sussex in the 1860s. From 1869 onwards, he resided at Knocknatrina House in County Laois, Ireland.

He died on 9 March 1919.

References

1836 births
1919 deaths
19th-century Irish people
People from County Laois
Irish expatriates in England
Irish inventors
People from Hove
Viscounts in the Peerage of Ireland
Prince of Wales's Leinster Regiment officers